Colotis aurigineus, the African golden Arab, veined gold or double-banded orange, is a butterfly of the family Pieridae. It is found in southern Sudan, Kenya, Uganda, northeastern Zaire, Malawi and northwest Zambia.

The larva feeds on Maerua species.

External links
"Colotis Hübner, [1819]" at Markku Savela's Lepidoptera and Some Other Life Forms

Butterflies described in 1883
aurigineus
Butterflies of Africa
Taxa named by Arthur Gardiner Butler